Fantastic Voyage is the fourth album released by the funk band Lakeside. Released in 1980 on the SOLAR Records label, it was produced by the band's members. It has been certified Gold in United States for sales over 500,000. The album would eventually go Platinum for sales over 1,000,000.

Track listing
"Fantastic Voyage"  6:10   	
"Your Love Is on the One"  6:20
"I Need You"   5:50 	
"Strung Out"  5:07 	
"Say Yes"  5:16 	
"Eveready Man"   4:37 	
"I Love Everything You Do"   4:30 	
"Say Yes (Reprise)"  0:29

Personnel
 Bass, Percussion - Marvin Craig
 Conductor, Arranged By (Strings) - Gene Dozier
 Congas, Timbales, Percussion, Synthesizer (Bass) - Fred Lewis
 Drums, Percussion - Fred Alexander, Jr.
 Lead Vocals, Backing Vocals - Thomas Shelby, Tiemeyer McCain
 Lead Vocals, Backing Vocals, Electric Piano (Wurlitzer), Electric Piano (Fender Rhodes), Percussion - Mark Adam Wood, Jr.
 Lead Vocals, Backing Vocals, Guitar, Bass, Electric Piano (Wurlitzer), Clavinet, Synthesizer (Arp Quadra) - Otis Stokes
 Piano (Acoustic), Electric Piano (Fender Rhodes), Electric Piano (Wurlitzer), Clavinet, Synthesizer (Arp Odyssey), Synthesizer (Arp Quadra) - Norman Beavers
 Rhythm Guitar, Guitar (Lead), Bells (Concert), Synthesizer - Stephen Shockley

Reception
Allmusic gave the release a 3 out of 5.

Charts

Weekly charts

Year-end charts

References

External links
 Lakeside-Fantastic Voyage  at Discogs

1980 albums
SOLAR Records albums
Lakeside (band) albums